The Association for the Study of Classical African Civilizations (ASCAC) is an independent study group organization founded in 1984 by Drs. John Henrik Clarke, Asa Grant Hilliard, Leonard Jeffries, Jacob H. Carruthers, Yosef Ben-Jochannan, and Maulana Karenga  that is devoted to the rescue, reconstruction, and restoration of African history and culture. It is an organization that provides the opportunity for "African peoples to educate other African peoples about their culture."  ASCAC was founded by scholars with ties to African-American communities in New York City, Chicago, Atlanta, and Los Angeles and derives its membership from African Americans across class and occupational locations. The organization has since expanded into an international organization, with membership regions representing the continental United States, as well as the Caribbean, Africa, and Europe. ASCAC has four commissions which advance this agenda: education, research, spiritual development, and creative production.  Along with creating study groups throughout the world, ASCAC holds an annual conference, operates a youth enrichment program, and is editing a comprehensive history of Africa.

Association Founding 
The Association for the Study of Classical African Civilizations was initially conceptualized and developed during the First Annual Ancient Egyptian Studies Conference in Los Angeles, California, on February 26, 1984, by:
Dr. John Henrik Clark
Dr. Asa Grant Hilliard
Dr. Leonard Jeffries
Dr. Yosef Ben-Jochannan
Dr. Maulana Karenga
Dr. Jacob H. Carruthers

References

External links
 

Organizations based in Maryland
Organizations established in 1984